Porta Romana is a station on Line 3 of the Milan Metro which opened on 16 December 1990 as part of the extension of the line from Duomo to Porta Romana. The line terminated here until 12 May 1991, when it was extended south to San Donato.

The station is located at the extreme south of Corso di Porta Romana, in Piazza Medaglie d'Oro. According to the first projects, the station was to be called Medaglie d'Oro after the homonymous square.

The station, like all others on Line 3, is underground, and it is the first one in the southern track to be built in a single tunnel, marking the exit from the city center.

The station is near Bocconi University.

References

Line 3 (Milan Metro) stations
Railway stations opened in 1990